Maureen Cain (born 1938) received her bachelor's degree from London School of Economics in 1959, and she attained her PhD from the London School of Economics in 1969. After graduating from LSE, Cain became a professor.

Cain's three main teaching posts have been:
 A professor and reader at Brunel University (1968–1979).
 The Chair of Sociology at The University of the West Indies (1987–1995).
 A Reader at the Law School at University of Birmingham (1995–2005 approximately) – where she still continues to supervise graduate students.

Some of the courses she has taught include:
 Sociology of Law and Crime
 Sociology of Law

Cain also became a frequent visitor of Cambridge University between 1981 and 1987.

President of the British Society of Criminology from 2003 to 2006.

Description of research interests
Cain's interests have been as broad as looking and studying the major works of Marx & Engels "Sociology of Law" to looking into "Society and the Policeman's Role". Cain's more current teaching and research interests have come from her years in Trinidad teaching at The University of the West Indies. While in Trinidad she studied Women, Crime and Social Harms. Cain's original interest and her PhD dissertation was "Society and the Policeman's Role", which is noted for being ahead of its time in feminist criminology. Cain then moved away from criminology to look at "The main themes of Marx's and Engels' sociology of law" then she returned to a look into policing when she wrote "Racism, the police, and community policing: a comment on the Scarman Report”.
 Cain then wrote “Orientalism, Occidentalism and the sociology of Crime” and today she is about to publish a new book called “Globality, Crime and Criminology” due to be available for sale 30 July 2010.

Major works
Article Review – Towards Transgression: A new direction in feminist criminology

Cain's major argument in Towards Transgression were that there are: three traditional approaches of feminist criminology – 1. Unequal treatment 2. The nature of female criminality and 3. Women as victims.  Cain argued that each of them has tested the limits of traditional criminological formulations.  And then she said there is a new emergence of an alternative approach called "Transgressive Criminology".

Cain argues that there are two parts to Feminist Criminology – 1. The traditional feminist criminology and 2. The shift towards transgression:

1. The Traditional Concerns of Feminist Criminology

Equity studies

a) Traditionally men and women have been treated differently. In the article we see that women were given lesser penalties because of their sex. A consistent finding was that girls dealt with by the courts for behavioural offences were more likely to be incarcerated than their male counterparts. These equity findings bring up many political and academic questions as to why and how the world we live in can be equalised. We (Criminologists) cannot explain why the treatment and punishment is the way it is. Lastly men and women, boys and girls are treated as categories. They are measuring the social construction of gender rather than the issue of sex differences.

Female Criminality

b) Early female criminology information was found based on self-report surveys about illegal activity. The results from the self-report surveys found that girls were worse than what was originally perceived, but girls still were not as bad as boys. The women studied seem to have all of the advantages possible.  The self-report surveys were important because they were the beginning of looking at men separately from women.

Women as victims

c) The first area of victimisation that women tended to experience was when they are beaten by unsuccessful partners to re-claim dominance. The second area of victimisation is that against women and children, which “touches a political nerve” and male defence claim is an unthinkable claim against women and children. This creates an uneven balance between men and women and children. The third victimisation for women is rape, which tends to be quite political. It was also found that the home was the most dangerous place for women and girls to be victimised.

The fracture of criminology

d) Women seem to be “entangled in or confronted by a hegemonic web which is resistant to every attack.”  Cain suggests that this demonstrates that feminist criminology must be transgressed.

2. The Transgressive Alternative

Transgressive strategies

a) Three transgressive strategies demonstrated in the article: i. Reflexivity; “enables us to see that everyone who comes into contact with women seem to be preoccupied with female sexuality and with a range of gender approved ways of behaving”, ii. Deconstruction; “the examination of discourse and the examination of internal logic and the ways it is deployed”, iii. Reconstruction; “it involves getting women or girls outside or beyond discourse and enables them to transgress”.

Studying women

b) Every woman is defined as “that which is not a man”. Hegemony is the reason women have pushed for “women only” spaces. For example, in Sexual Harassment calls, women had to be uncomfortable in their jobs. Men often said that the women ‘misunderstood them’. Cain says “Speaking of the unspeakable is both difficult and dangerous”.  Cain argues that Transgressive Criminology will give ‘Women only’ studies a place in criminology and give it both political and theoretical validity.

Starting from outside

c) Feminist criminology must start with the exploration of the woman's entire life. We must look at the social construction of gender; we must look at the female penal system, and look at the conventional vs. the radical.

Studying men

d) 1. “Gender is a relational concept” – men and masculinity exist in comparison to women and femininity. If we exclude men from research then we are basically doing to men what was done to women traditionally.
2.  “Women are constituted in their absence occupied by men” – Police, Judges, Lawyers are male dominated professions and the absence of women may play a role in how women are treated.
3. “We must study men because Lombroso found that most criminals are from the working class” – men dominate the working class and traditionally most criminals have been men.
Reflexivity and self-help
e) Practitioners, Guards and other support staff need training, self-reflection about the typical routines, need to decipher between control images and images which express reality.

Women and Politics

f) We must learn from women who have engaged in political struggle, such as resistance and repression.

Maureen Cain was successful in supporting her thesis through her claims. Cain proved that traditionally women were: treated unequally, they were segregated criminally and they were made victims in Western penal systems.  Cain then proved that there is a new emergence of ‘Transgressive Criminology’ which looks deeper into women's issues in Criminology and focuses not as women as inferior but as women as a product of their entire environment and an area needing more work.

 Book Review  – Society and the policeman's role

Chapter 1 – “Background” 

Cain's major themes in “Society and the Policeman’s Role” were 1. The organisation and behaviour of the police and 2. Clarifying the explanation of behaviour in terms of pressures and definitions. Cain looks specifically at
1. Citizens rights and Officer Discretion – What type of power the police actually possess?
2. Why Police operate and what they can do – What is the role of the police?
3. Effects of the police action – What happens if a police officer arrests someone or charges them?
4. Use of force and social order – Amount of force needed and social control issue.

Chapter 2 – Rural Police Work

Cain looked at rural police work and noted that Police Officers in local areas must be “A Jack of All trades and Master of Many” police officers in rural communities face issues because the area that they live in is so small that they get to intimately know many of their many roles within the community. Some issues that police face are:
1. Perks – People making life pleasant so giving bribes or discounts because you are a police officer
2. Easing behaviour – a learned behaviour to get people to calm down or talk to you, such as offering a person a cup of tea or a cigarette to
3. Official Easing – Opportunities made possible by the police force such as hanging out with or playing on a sports team with some of the officers.

Chapter 3 – City Police work

City Police work is described by Cain as often challenging;  because of the size of the force, some people often feel invisible from their senior officers. Officers have a need to maintain the ease for facilities. Officers are often dependent on other officers .  City police officers tend to divide their work into two categories:

1. Important Crime – such as homicides, rapes, etc. Well published and “blingy" crime
2. Real police work – which is the paperwork and the less glamorous side of policing.

Chapter 4 – interdependence with the community

Rural police tend to share a conceptual framework in which they have similar biographies, similar norms, standards and values. Urban police officers face more challenges working together, because they come from more diverse backgrounds, the sheer number of people that they are surrounded by and the different types of situations they can face in a short period of time. Rural police officers receive three major sources of community empowerment:
1. Rural officers depend socially on local people – they provide them with their food, and other necessities they need to live.
2. Officers wives and families depend on locals to survive and sustain.
3. Rural Police depend on locals more in their work situations, they need them as eyewitnesses, they need the locals to tell them if something is out of the ordinary and they need them to find out history of individuals in the community.

Chapter 5 – Interdependence with family

Police officers tend to have a high level of interdependence within their families. They need their families to help them feel like they are doing a good job, like they are making the right decisions and to ensure each other that they are integrating well with the members of the community. Women and wives of police officers often compared themselves to other families of similar situation to try to describe how they feel about their work, their living situation and their lives.

Chapter 6 – Interdependence with Senior Officers 

Cain explains that Police Officers face a cohesion with their superiors, and it is essential for them to have good communication at all times. But in the system they use, which is a hierarchical organisation, there is often a divide among superiors and inferior individuals.

Chapter 7 – Interdependence with Colleagues

It is very important, as Cain explains, for police officers to experience relationships with their colleagues. The relationship tends to look like the following – experienced police officers exert power over the recruits, experienced officers tend to exert power over the cadets, senior officers tend to exert over experienced officers and the government exerts power over the senior officials.

Contributions to feminist criminology
Maureen Cain's biggest contribution to feminist criminology was her first contribution, “Society and the Policeman’s Role”. This has been noted as being “Ahead of its feminist time”.  "Society and the Policeman's Role" is just one example of her contribution to feminist criminology and because  of this initial and prolific contribution Maureen Cain can be considered a pioneer in the field of feminist criminology.
Cain also looks at women's issues in many of her articles of Transgressions in Criminology as she looks at the historical treatment of men vs women and she brings up many political questions as to the level of rights surrounding feminism.

Bibliography of work
 Cain, M. (1973). Society and the Policeman's Role. London: Routledge and Keegan.
 Cain, M. & Hunt, A. (1979). Marx and Engels on Law. London, England: Academic Press.
 Cain, M. (1983). The International State. London: Academic Press.
 Cain, M. (1989). Growing up Good: Policing the behaviour of girls in Europe. London, England: Sage Publications.
Cain, M. (1990). Towards Transgression: New Directions in Feminist Criminology. International Journal of Sociology of Laws, 252–273.
 Cain, M. (1993). Lawyers Works: Translation and Transgressions. London, England: Open University Press.
 Cain, M. (2000). Orientalism, Occidentialism and the Sociology of Crime. British Journal of Sociology, 239–260.
 Cain, M., & Wahidin, A. (July 2006). Ageing, Crime and Society. Devon, UK: Willian Publishing.
Cain, M., & Howe, A. (November 2008). Women, Crime and Social Harm: Towards a Criminology for the Global Age. Oxford, England: Oxford Publishing.
 Cain, M. (31 July 2010). Globality, Crime and Criminology. London, England: Sage Publishing.

References

Living people
British sociologists
1938 births
Academics of the University of Birmingham
British criminologists
British women criminologists
British women sociologists